Facundo Bagnis and Andrés Molteni were the defending champions but chose not to defend their title.

Rafael Matos and Felipe Meligeni Alves won the title after defeating Ignacio Carou and Luciano Darderi 6–4, 6–4 in the final.

Seeds

Draw

References

External links
 Main draw

Uruguay Open - Doubles
2021 Doubles